Football This Week is a TV sports program broadcast on the DuMont Television Network. The 15-minute program aired on Thursdays at 10:45 pm ET from October 11 to December 6, 1951.

Episode status
As with most DuMont series, no episodes are known to exist.

See also
List of programs broadcast by the DuMont Television Network
List of surviving DuMont Television Network broadcasts
1951-52 United States network television schedule
Football Sidelines
Pro Football Highlights

References

Bibliography
David Weinstein, The Forgotten Network: DuMont and the Birth of American Television (Philadelphia: Temple University Press, 2004) 
Alex McNeil, Total Television, Fourth edition (New York: Penguin Books, 1980) 
Tim Brooks and Earle Marsh, The Complete Directory to Prime Time Network TV Shows, Third edition (New York: Ballantine Books, 1964)

External links
Football This Week at IMDB
DuMont historical website

1951 American television series debuts
1951 American television series endings
Black-and-white American television shows
National Football League on television
Lost television shows
DuMont sports programming